Lucie Pinson is a French environmentalist, founder and director of the NGO Reclaim Finance, and one of the 6 winners of the 2020 Goldman Environmental Prize, the most important award for environmental activists.

Biography
Lucie Pinson was born in 1985 in Nantes. She studied political sciences and environmental sciences. In 2013 she joined Friends of the Earth. In 2020 she founded Reclaim Finance.

Notes

Living people
1985 births
Goldman Environmental Prize awardees
French women activists
French environmentalists
French women environmentalists
21st-century French women
21st-century French people
People from Nantes